Karaite or Qaraite may refer to:

Karaite Judaism, a Jewish religious movement that rejects the Talmud
Crimean Karaites, an ethnic group derived from Turkic-speaking adherents of Karaite Judaism in Eastern Europe
Karaim language,   Turkic language of Crimean Karaites.  Its Crimean dialect is an ethnolect of the Crimean Tatar language.

See also
Karate (disambiguation)
Keraites, a Turco-Mongolian tribe

Language and nationality disambiguation pages